Hello Sailor was a New Zealand pop/rock band originally formed in 1975. Although the band formally disbanded in 1980 after just two albums, they have continued to sporadically reunite during the years since; recording a further four albums and performing numerous live tours and appearances.

History 
The band's guitarist/vocalists Dave McArtney and Harry Lyon first played together in the mid 1960s.

Their first gig as Hello Sailor was at the Trees Tavern in Tokoroa.

After several lineup changes, the band released its first album, Hello Sailor, in 1977, which went on to become the first New Zealand made record to be certified gold. 
The line-up at that time was Graham Brazier on vocals and some guitar and saxophone, McArtney and Lyon on guitars and vocals, Lisle Kinney on bass, and Ricky Ball on drums.

Their second album, Pacifica Amour, was released in 1978, after the band had made their first visit to America to try to crack the American market. In 1979 the band left for Australia, but this trip was also not a success. Hello Sailor formally disbanded in 1980. 

In 1982, a compilation EP was released, titled Last Chance to Dance. It contained five tracks taken from the band's two earlier albums, plus an additional rare track "Here Comes Johnny".

The classic line-up came together again within Graham Brazier's early-1980s band The Legionnaires, and in 1985 decided to reform as Hello Sailor (with former Coup D'État bass player Neil Hannan replacing Lisle Kinney). The band released a new single "Fugitive For Love", and a follow-up album Shipshape & Bristol Fashion, which included a re-recorded version of the single. In addition to new songs, the album also contained some reworked material which had originally been recorded during their various solo projects since 1980. Following on from the release of the album, the band toured extensively throughout New Zealand during late 1985 and into 1986.

After another hiatus, the band returned in 1994, recording a new album titled The Album, and again commenced a nationwide promotional tour. Three singles were released from "The Album"; "New Tattoo", "Never Fade Away, and "Raging with the Storm".

In 1996, a two-disc Compilation album The Sailor Story was released. In addition to Hello Sailor tracks, the album also contained material which had been recorded by the band's members during their various solo projects.

In 2005, Hello Sailor's 1977 song "Gutter Black" was chosen as the title music for New Zealand television series Outrageous Fortune. This not only sparked renewed interest for the band, but also resulted in a favourable renegotiation of the publishing rights for Hello Sailor's earlier material.

In 2007, the band released the album, When Your Lights Are Out, which featured all-acoustic versions of their best-known material.

In 2011 the band entered the APRA NZ Music Hall of Fame .
 
In 2012, the band again reunited to record an album of new material Surrey Crescent Moon.

Founding member Dave McArtney died in 2013. 

In 2015, the band were planning their 40th-anniversary tour when Brazier suffered a heart attack. The tour was postponed while he recovered, but he died shortly after, marking the end of the band's career.

Discography

Studio albums

Compilation albums

Singles

Awards

Aotearoa Music Awards
The Aotearoa Music Awards (previously known as New Zealand Music Awards (NZMA)) are an annual awards night celebrating excellence in New Zealand music and have been presented annually since 1965.

! 
|-
| 2011 || Hello Sailor|| New Zealand Music Hall of Fame ||  || 
|-

Book references
 
 Dix, John, Stranded in Paradise, Penguin, 2005. 
 Eggleton, David, Ready To Fly, Craig Potton, 2003. 
 Spittle, Gordon, Counting The Beat, GP Publications, 1997.

References

External links
 Official Home Page
 Dave McArtney's Home Page
 Hello Sailor Biography on sergent.com.au
 Hello Sailor at muzic.net.nz
 

APRA Award winners
New Zealand pop rock groups
1970s in New Zealand music